

Major bridges

References 
 Nicolas Janberg, Structurae.com, International Database for Civil and Structural Engineering

 Others references

See also 

 Transport in the Democratic Republic of the Congo
 List of roads in the Democratic Republic of the Congo

Further reading 
 

Congo

b
Bridges